was a Japanese manufacturer of consumer electronic components, founded in 1954.

The company was listed on the Tokyo Stock Exchange, was constituent of the Nikkei 225 stock index and provided its products through its subsidiaries in Asia, Europe, and North America. Mitsumi was primarily known as an OEM manufacturer of computer peripherals and input devices, Floppy and optical disc drives used in laptop computers, desktops, servers and the Famicom Disk System. On January 27, 2017, Minebea merged with Mitsumi to form MinebeaMitsumi.

Products

Video game console controllers
One of the company's most noticeable product lines were video game console controllers. Mitsumi manufactured the official controllers for the following consoles:
Nintendo Entertainment System/Famicom controller
Super Nintendo Entertainment System/Super Famicom controller
GameCube controller (Certain revisions only) and the WaveBird Wireless Controller
Panasonic 3DO Controller
Wii Remote and Wii Nunchuk (Certain revisions only)
PlayStation standard and DualShock controllers (Certain revisions only)
PlayStation 2 DualShock 2 controller (Certain revisions only)
Xbox original 'Duke' Controller and early 'Controller S' models

Other
Other products include:

 The Wi-Fi sub-PCB for the Nintendo DS family of systems (According to the FCC ID on the bottom of each system) and manufactured at least some Nintendo DS Lite consoles for Nintendo.
 Remote controls for several home electronics brands. 
 keyboards, mice and floppy drives for a number of computer manufacturers. These include the Apple Pro Keyboard and the Mighty Mouse, the keyboards, mice and floppy drives for the Amiga, the keyboard for the VIC-20 and TI-99/4A, etc.
 Certain hardware parts for the Nintendo Wii U system.
 Some components of the XM Satellite Radio system.

References

External links

 
 Mitsumi CDR, DVDR and Firmware

2017 mergers and acquisitions
Companies listed on the Tokyo Stock Exchange
Electronics companies established in 1954
Electronics companies disestablished in 2017
Electronics companies of Japan
Defunct defense companies of Japan
Japanese brands
Manufacturing companies based in Tokyo
Tama, Tokyo
Japanese companies established in 1954
Japanese companies disestablished in 2017